Betna is a village in Kamrup rural district, in the state of Assam, India, situated in north bank of river Brahmaputra. 

This place used to be Capital of King Arimatta

Transport
The village is located north of National Highway 27 and connected to nearby towns and cities like Baihata, Rangiya and Guwahati with regular buses and other modes of transportation.

See also
 Baruajani
 Bhalukghata

References

Villages in Kamrup district